The Muhammadzai (also Mohammadzai, Mohammedzai, Mohmandzai, Mamanzai, etc.) is a Pashtun tribe residing in Charsadda, modern day Pakistan. The tribe should not be confused with the Muhammadzai of the Barakzai Durrani, who were for many years the ruling family of Afghanistan. This group of Muhammadzai is located in (Charsadda) modern day Pakistan, has an altogether different Pashtun lineage with son of Zamand, third son of Kharshbun.

Origins
According to Pashtun genealogy, the Muhammadzai are descended from Qais Abdur Rashid through his son Sarbani, and his son Kharshbun. The Afghan Muhammadzai (Barakzai) are descendants of Sharkhbun and Kharshbun is his brother. Kharshbun had three sons, Kand, Zamand, and Kasi. Muhammad was Zamand's son so they were popular with the Muhammadzai tribe (see chart below).

Location
The Muhamamdzai are found primarily in Hashtnagar, an area in today's Charsadda District, Khyber Pakhtunkhwa, Pakistan that borders the Swat River's left bank. They were originally said to have resided in Afghanistan, but moved to Charsadda region, then called Hashtnagar as a result of a war against dilazaks in which Muhammadzais joined forces with yousafzais and gigyanis and divided the lands between themselves. The Muhammadzais took control of Hashtnagar (now Charsadda district) which was the most fertile region and the gigyanis took southern Bajaur and Doaba because the branches of the tribe and the villages they each inhabited share the same names. The following breakdown comes from an 1878 report on what was then part of the Peshawar District: Tangi (Barazai and Nasratzai), Sherpao, Umarzai, Turangzai, Utmanzai, Dargai, all these tribes are living in Charsadda, and Prang. Rose's tribal glossary adds that "with them are settled a few descendants of Muhammad's brothers, from one of whom, Kheshgi, one of their principal villages is named."
One sub division of Muhammadzai Hashtnagar arrived Ghwarband valley of district Shangla and settled there.

Although mainly located in the Hashtnagar area of Charsadda, the Muhammadzai are also based in Akora Khattak, Peshawar and Islamabad.

Politics and influence
The most famous Muhammadzai tribesmen were the Pashtun leaders Dr Khan Sahib and his brother Abdul Ghaffar Khan, his son Khan Abdul Wali Khan and his grandson Asfandyar Wali Khan. As well as the prominent Pashto poet Ghani Khan son of Abdul Ghaffar Khan and Aimal Wali khan They are originally from Utmanzai, where their father was a well-to-do landlord and village khan. Aftab Ahmad Khan Sherpao is another well known leader and a chairman of QWP. 

The Muhammadzai are a highly influential and educated Pashtun tribe and have been in various senior positions in the Pakistani bureaucracy, judiciary, politics and military.

References

Sarbani Pashtun tribes